Gymnocypris scleracanthus is a species of cyprinid fish endemic to China.

References 

scleracanthus
Fish described in 1992
Freshwater fish of China
Cyprinid fish of Asia